Kiliann Witschi (born 9 November 1985) is a Swiss retired professional footballer who played as a defender.

References

External links
 
 
 

Living people
1985 births
Swiss men's footballers
Swiss expatriate footballers
Association football defenders
Swiss Challenge League players
2. Bundesliga players
Cypriot First Division players
Neuchâtel Xamax FCS players
FC La Chaux-de-Fonds players
APEP FC players
FC Chiasso players
Karlsruher SC players
FC Lugano players
Expatriate footballers in Cyprus
Expatriate footballers in Germany
People from Neuchâtel
Sportspeople from the canton of Neuchâtel